Constantin Sturdza (born 24 August 1989) is a Swiss tennis player. He is the member of Sturdza family.

Sturdza has a career high ATP doubles ranking of 1190 achieved on 28 September 2015.

Sturdza made his ATP main draw debut at the 2016 Geneva Open in the doubles draw partnering Victor Hănescu.

References

External links
 
 

1989 births
Living people
Swiss male tennis players
Swiss people of Romanian descent
Constantin